Charles Villholth (13 January 1897 – 12 January 1959) was a Danish sports shooter. He competed in the 25 m pistol event at the 1948 Summer Olympics.

References

External links
 

1897 births
1959 deaths
Danish male sport shooters
Olympic shooters of Denmark
Shooters at the 1948 Summer Olympics
People from Randers
Sportspeople from the Central Denmark Region